Natik Abbas Hasan al-Bayati is an Iraqi Shiite Turkmen politician and a member of the Iraqi National Assembly. He is a member of the State of Law Coalition.

He was exiled from Iraq under Saddam Hussein and became the Secretary General of the Islamic Union of Iraqi Turkoman. He was appointed to the "Follow-Up and Arrangement Committee" of the Iraqi opposition following a conference in London in 2002 

He was a member of the committee that drafted the Constitution of Iraq and the current committee considering amendments to the constitution.

References

External links
 Campaign WebSite for 2010 Elections

Living people
Members of the Council of Representatives of Iraq
Iraqi Shia Muslims
Islamic Union of Iraqi Turkoman politicians
Year of birth missing (living people)